Thunder Bay National Marine Sanctuary and Underwater Preserve is a United States National Marine Sanctuary on Lake Huron's Thunder Bay, within the northeastern region of the U.S. state of Michigan. It protects an estimated 116 historically significant shipwrecks ranging from nineteenth-century wooden side-wheelers to twentieth-century steel-hulled steamers. There are a great many wrecks in the sanctuary, and their preservation and protection is a concern for national policymakers. The landward boundary of the sanctuary extends from the western boundary of Presque Isle County to the southern boundary of Alcona County. The sanctuary extends east from the lakeshore to the international border. Alpena is the largest city in the area.

History

The National Oceanic and Atmospheric Administration established Thunder Bay National Marine Sanctuary and Underwater Preserve in 2000. It became the thirteenth overall and first on the Great Lakes. Original boundaries followed that of Alpena County to 83 degrees west longitude totaling . The marine sanctuary contains many shipwrecks, such as the hull of package freighter SS Pewabic.

Great Lakes Maritime Heritage Center
Tied to the sanctuary is the Great Lakes Maritime Heritage Center. The museum, located in Alpena on the Thunder Bay River, features exhibits about local shipwrecks and the Great Lakes, an auditorium, an archaeological conservation lab, and education areas.

See also
List of shipwrecks in the Thunder Bay National Marine Sanctuary
Michigan Underwater Preserves
Rockport State Park

References

External links
Thunder Bay National Marine Sanctuary and Underwater Preserve NOAA
Great Lakes Maritime Heritage Center NOAA
Michigan Underwater Preserve Council
"In Michigan, a Park Made of Water" – New York Times

Archaeological sites in Michigan
Landmarks in Michigan
Marine parks of Michigan
Maritime museums in Michigan
Museums in Alpena County, Michigan
National Marine Sanctuaries of the United States
Protected areas of Alpena County, Michigan
Protected areas established in 2000
2000 establishments in Michigan